Edenílson Andrade dos Santos (born 18 December 1989), simply known as Edenílson, is a Brazilian footballer who plays for Atlético Mineiro. Mainly a central midfielder, he can also play as a right back.

Club career
Edenílson began his career with Guarani de Venâncio Aires in 2008, but moved to Caxias shortly after. His professional debut came in the 2009 Gaúcho, when he entered the second half of the match against Veranópolis, on 22 January. He scored his first goal for the club later in that year, in a 3–1 win over rivals Juventude. Edenílson played 82 games for the Grenás, mostly as a starter, winning 36 and drawing 22 of those matches.

In 2011, Edenílson joined Corinthians, where he featured regularly before moving to Italy with Genoa in 2014. In the following year, he was bought by Udinese.

On 31 August 2016, Edenílson returned to Genoa on a season-long loan deal. After his loan to Genoa was cut short at the end of March, he signed with Internacional on loan until the end of the season.

On 11 July 2018, Internacional exercised the option in the loan contract and made the transfer permanent, signing a three-year contract with Edenílson.

On 22 December 2022, Edenílson joined Atlético Mineiro on a two-year deal.

International career
He made his debut for the Brazil national football team on 9 September 2021 in a World Cup qualifier against Peru.

Career statistics

Club

International

Honours
Corinthians
 Campeonato Brasileiro Série A: 2011
 Copa Libertadores: 2012
 FIFA Club World Cup: 2012
 Campeonato Paulista: 2013
 Recopa Sudamericana: 2013

References

External links

Living people
1989 births
Association football midfielders
Brazilian footballers
Brazil international footballers
Brazilian expatriate footballers
Sociedade Esportiva e Recreativa Caxias do Sul players
Sport Club Corinthians Paulista players
Genoa C.F.C. players
Udinese Calcio players
Sport Club Internacional players
Clube Atlético Mineiro players
Campeonato Brasileiro Série A players
Campeonato Brasileiro Série C players
Serie A players
Expatriate footballers in Italy
Footballers from Porto Alegre